Kidd's Beach is a small coastal resort town in the Eastern Cape, South Africa situated on the Mkhanzi River about 28 kilometres from East London, South Africa. The name "Mkhanzi" is  derived from the Xhosa word "umkhanzi", which means "bulrush", or Typha capensis. Kidd's Beach was named after Charles Kidd, who was the mayor of nearby King William's Town in the 1860s.

References

Populated places in Buffalo City Metropolitan Municipality
Beaches of South Africa
Tourist attractions in the Eastern Cape